Sheethal Goutham Uthappa (born 6 June 1981) is an Indian former professional tennis player.

Goutham has a career-high singles ranking of 591 by the WTA, achieved on 24 September 2001. She also has a career-high WTA doubles ranking of 477, reached on 27 August 2001. Goutham won five singles and 13 doubles titles on the ITF Women's Circuit.

Playing for India Fed Cup team, Goutham has a win–loss record of 1–1.

She started playing tennis at the age of 9. Her brother Arjun Goutham also plays tennis and has helped her in her training. Sheethal Goutham married her fiancé, cricketer Robin Uthappa, in March 2016.

ITF finals

Singles: 8 (5–3)

Doubles: 22 (13–9)

References

External links
 
 
 

1981 births
Living people
Indian female tennis players
Sportspeople from Bangalore